Killiyur is a village in Tiruvarur district, Tamil Nadu, India.

References

Villages in Tiruvarur district